Indraprastha College for Women, also known as Indraprastha College or IP College, is the oldest women's college in Delhi. Established in 1924, it is a constituent college of University of Delhi.

The institution offers graduate and post-graduate courses in Economics, Liberal Arts, Commerce, Literature, Computer Science, Multimedia Media & Mass Communication etc. In 2020, it was ranked 11th among arts colleges in India by India Today.

History
The origins of IP College lie in the Indraprastha Girls School. It was founded in 1904, at the call of noted freedom fighter, educationist and theosophist Annie Besant by a group of Delhi theosophists, led by Lala Jugal Kishore, in Chhipiwara, Old Delhi. Intermediate school was added in 1924 and the Indraprastha College for Women, came into being, with Leonora Gmeiner (from Kapunda, South Australia) as its first principal.

Soon the University of Delhi, which itself was founded in 1922, recognised it as a constituent college. Degree courses were introduced in 1930s and in 1938, the university listed I.P. College as a degree college. After its existence in Chhipiwara during its early years, the college moved to Chandrawali Bhawan, Civil Lines. It moved again to Alipur House at Alipur Road (now Sham Nath Road), the former office of the commander-in-chief in 1938, near Kashmiri Gate, where it is today. The building has become a heritage property.

In 1952, the Kalavati Gupta Hostel named after the second principal of the college was inaugurated.

On 3 July 1984, Diamond Jubilee celebrations of the college were held

In 2009, a hostel to accommodate 200 students was added on the  college premises.

Campus

Facilities
 Library
 Auditorium
 Information and communications technology (ICT) Centre
 2 Computer Labs
 Audio Visual Production Centre
 Medical Room
 Cafeteria
 2 Hostels

Sports facility
Gymnasium
Basketball court
Tennis court
Badminton court
Squash court
Shooting range
Table tennis 
Judo floor
Swimming pool

The college offers facilities for other sports as well, such as archery, athletics, handball, volleyball, cricket, kho-kho, and others.

Other amenities

Wi-Fi campus
Canara Bank branch

Organisation and administration

Centres 
 Centre for Earth Studies
 Museum and Archives Learning Resource Centre
 Translation and Translation Studies Centre
 Centre for Interdisciplinary Studies

Academics

Academic programmes

Undergraduate courses
 Economics
 English
 Geography
 Hindi
 History
 Mathematics
 Music
 Philosophy
 Political Science
 Psychology
 Sanskrit
 Sociology
 B.A. Prog.
 Commerce
 Computer Science
 Multimedia and Mass Communication (BMMMC)

Graduate courses
 Economics
 Geography
 History
 Operational Research
 Psychology
 Mathematics
 Philosophy
 Sanskrit
 English
 Hindi
 Music
 Political Science

Financial assistance
Students belonging to economically weaker sections are eligible for fee concession. Merit cum means based scholarships are also awarded by the college to deserving students.
There is a book bank facility in the library from where needy students can borrow textbooks for the whole academic year.
Some special scholarships are also provided by the Delhi University for students belonging to SC/ST/BPL/PWD categories.

Student life

Indraprastha College is the only college of Delhi University to offer the Bachelor in Mass Media and Mass Communication (BMMMC) degree.

In 2005, the college added The cyber cafe wing with offices of National Service Scheme (NSS) and National Cadet Corps (NCC).

In 2014, IP College became one of the first colleges in the University of Delhi to set up a formal Department of Environmental Studies, which is its youngest department.

Every spring, the college celebrates its annual festival, Shruti. Other popular events include the annual debating tournament Vivaad organised by the English debating society and the annual theatre fest Kirdaar organised by the Dramatics society.

Clubs and societies
 La Cadenza: Western Music Society
 Abhivyakti: Dramatics Society
 Alaap: Indian Music Society
 Vidath: Hindi Editorial society 
 Croydon: Fine Arts Society
 Mridang: Indian Dance Society
 Oghma: English Editorial Society
 Ananta : The Science Society
 The English Debating Society
 Hindi Debating Society
 Gandhi Study Circle
 Laashya: Contemporary Dance Society 
 Northeast Society
 Eco Club
 Enactus IPCW
 NSS & NCC
 Quiz Club
 Simulacra: Film and Photography Society
 Women's Development Cell (WDC)
 Arthagya: The Economics Association.
Jeet-The career and guidance cell
 Baithak Society- Music Archiving and Listening Room
 Afroza: Western Dance Society

Past principals
 Leonara G. Miner, first principal, 1924
 Aruna Sitesh (1997–2007)

Notable alumni

 Abhilasha Kumari, first woman Chief Justice of Manipur High Court 
 Ajit Iqbal Singh, mathematician 
 Ambika Soni, former Minister of Information and Broadcasting
 Aruna Roy, social activist and recipient of Ramon Magsaysay Award
 Arundhati Virmani, historian
 Asha Pande, first Indian woman to receive the Légion d'honneur
 Binalakshmi Nepram, activist from Manipur
Chitra Narayanan, former IFS officer
Deepika Singh, television actor
 Deepa Sahi, actress and producer
 Dipannita Sharma, model and Bollywood actress
 Jaspinder Narula, playback singer
 Kamala Laxman, cartoonist
 Kanchan Chaudhary Bhattacharya, first woman Director General of Police
 Kavita Kaushik, television actor
 Kunzang Choden, first Bhutanese woman to write a novel
 Kusha Kapila , Fashion Editor and Internet Celebrity
 Madhumita Raut, Odissi dancer
 Meira Kumar, the first woman to become the Speaker of the Lok Sabha
 Neetu Chandra, film actress and model
Pratima Puri, Doordarshan's first newsreader
 Qurratulain Hyder, Urdu writer
 Rajni Bakshi, freelance journalist
 Rama Vij, actress
 Salma Sultan, news anchor of Doordarshan
 Sharan Rani Backliwal, acclaimed Sarod player, recipient of Padma Shri and Padma Vibhushan
 Shyama Singh, former member of Parliament
 Sucheta Kriplani, former Chief Minister of Uttar Pradesh
 Utsa Patnaik, professor of economics, Jawaharlal Nehru University
 Varsha Dixit, author
 Veena Das, Krieger-Eisenhower Professor of Anthropology, Johns Hopkins University

Notable faculty
Ra'ana Liaquat Ali Khan, former First Lady of Pakistan
Tanika Sarkar, professor of history at Jawaharlal Nehru University

Further reading
 Knowledge, Power & Politics: Educational Institutions in India, edited by Mushirul Hasan. The Lotus Collection, 1998. 
 The Saga of Indraprastha College for Women, by Shanti Kamath, Narain Prasad, Indraprastha College for Women (Delhi, India). Published by Indraprastha Educational Trust, 2000.
 Women, education and politics: the women's movement and Delhi's Indraprastha College, by Meena Bhargava, Kalyani Dutta. Oxford University Press, 2005. .

See also
 Indraprastha College for Women alumni
Education in India
Literacy in India
List of institutions of higher education in Delhi

References

External links

 IP College Official website
 IP College Location wikimapia

Women's universities and colleges in Delhi
Delhi University
Arts colleges in India
Commerce colleges in India
Economics schools in India
Journalism schools in India
Schools in Colonial India
Educational institutions established in 1924
1924 establishments in India
British colonial architecture in India